This is a list of Iraqi Defence Ministers from 1921 till present.

List of Ministers of Defence

Kingdom of Iraq (1921–1958)

Iraqi Republic (1958–1968)

Ba'athist Iraq (1968–2003)

Republic of Iraq (2004–present)

References

Lists of government ministers of Iraq
Information Ministers
Government ministers of Iraq
Iraq